The Union Block on Main St. W. in Mayville, North Dakota was built in 1900.  It was listed on the National Register of Historic Places (NRHP) in 1985.

According to its NRHP nomination, the building "is significant for its distinctive commercial architecture which represents the work of an early North Dakota architect, William C. Albrant."  And it also "possesses integrity of location, design, setting, and craftsmanship."

References

Commercial buildings on the National Register of Historic Places in North Dakota
Commercial buildings completed in 1900
National Register of Historic Places in Traill County, North Dakota
1900 establishments in North Dakota
Mayville, North Dakota